News Writing is one of several academic events sanctioned by the University Interscholastic League, and one of four in the Journalism category.

News Writing is designed to test students' ability to read critically, to digest and prioritize information quickly, and to write clearly, accurately and succinctly. Emphasis is placed on mechanical and stylistic precision, lead writing, use of direct and indirect quotes, and news judgment.

Eligibility 
Students in Grade 9 through Grade 12 are eligible to enter this event.

Each school may send up to four students.

News Writing is an individual contest only; there is no team competition in this event.  However, the school with the best performance in the four journalism categories (Editorial Writing, Feature Writing, Headline Writing, and News Writing) is given a special team award.

Rules and scoring 
Students have 45 minutes to complete the contest; a time signal is given when 15 minutes remain.

Students are given a prompt and they are to respond with a news story.  Students are given the option of either handwriting the story or using a computer (a portable printer is required).

The judging criteria are as follows:
(1) Lead consists of the most timely and newsworthy information.
(2) Facts are presented in descending order of importance.
(3) Paragraph transition is smooth and logical.
(4) Direct and indirect quotes are used effectively.
(5) Writing is active, precise and stylistically exact.
(6) All news questions are answered.
(7) Editorialization is avoided.
(8) Secondary consideration is given to grammar, spelling and neatness.

All papers are read and critiqued, with the top six papers ranked.  There are no ties.

Determining the Winner
The top three individuals will advance to the next round.

As the top six papers are ranked 1-6, there are no ties.

For district meet academic championship and district meet sweepstakes awards, points are awarded to the school as follows:
Individual places: 1st--15, 2nd--12, 3rd--10, 4th--8, 5th--6, and 6th--4.
In addition, the five top places from each classification (A, AA, AAA, AAAA, and AAAAA) are judged against each other, and the overall winner is given a special "Tops in Texas" award.

List of prior winners 
2008

2007

References 
http://www.uil.utexas.edu/academics/archives/
http://www.uil.utexas.edu/academics/journalism/
Journalism Contest rules; Section 1025 covers the rules for News Writing
University Interscholastic League